The WDR Symphony Orchestra Cologne (German: WDR Sinfonieorchester Köln) is a German radio orchestra based in Cologne, where the orchestra mainly performs at two concert halls: the WDR Funkhaus Wallrafplatz and the Kölner Philharmonie.

History

The orchestra was founded in 1947 by Allied occupation authorities after World War II, as the orchestra of Nordwestdeutscher Rundfunk (NWDR; Northwest German Radio), with the name Kölner Rundfunk-Sinfonie-Orchester (Cologne Radio Symphony Orchestra). The orchestra became particularly known for its performances of 20th-century and contemporary music. It has commissioned and premiered works from such composers as Luciano Berio, Hans Werner Henze, Mauricio Kagel, Krzysztof Penderecki, Karlheinz Stockhausen and Bernd Alois Zimmermann. 

For the first part of its history, the orchestra did not have a principal conductor, but worked with guest conductors. Christoph von Dohnányi was the first conductor to serve as the orchestra's principal conductor, from 1964 to 1969. In the 1990s, the orchestra changed its name to the WDR Sinfonieorchester (WDR Symphony Orchestra).

In February 2017, Cristian Măcelaru first guest-conducted the orchestra. He returned for three subsequent guest appearances with the orchestra. In May 2019, the orchestra announced the appointment of Măcelaru as its next chief conductor, effective with the 2019–2020 season, with an initial contract of 3 years. In June 2020, the orchestra announced an extension of Măcelaru's contract through July 2025.

The orchestra has recorded commercially for such labels as Avie, Hänssler, Kairos, CPO, and Wergo.

See also
WDR Rundfunkorchester Köln

Principal conductors
 Christoph von Dohnányi (1964–1969)
 Zdeněk Mácal (1970–1974)
 Hiroshi Wakasugi (1977–1983)
 Gary Bertini (1983–1991)
 Hans Vonk (1991–1997)
 Semyon Bychkov (1997–2010)
 Jukka-Pekka Saraste (2010–2019)
 Cristian Măcelaru (2019–present)

References

External links

  

Westdeutscher Rundfunk
German symphony orchestras
Music in Cologne
Musical groups established in 1947
Radio and television orchestras
1947 establishments in Germany